Wang Jiong is the name of:

Wang Jiong (politician) (born 1964), Chinese politician
Wang Jiong (footballer) (born 1994), Chinese association footballer